The 2015 UCI Women's Road Rankings is an overview of the UCI Women's Road Rankings, based upon the results in all UCI-sanctioned races of the 2015 women's road cycling season.

Summary

Final ranking.

Individual World Ranking (top 100)
Final ranking 2015

UCI Teams Ranking
Final ranking of the 2015 UCI women's teams.

Nations Ranking 
Final ranking 2015

References

2015 in women's road cycling
UCI Women's Road World Rankings